The name Arlene has been used for eleven tropical cyclones in the Atlantic Ocean, making Arlene the most frequently used storm name in the basin.

 Tropical Storm Arlene (1959), a tropical storm which brought flooding to Louisiana, killing one person
 Hurricane Arlene (1963), a Category 3 major hurricane which passed over Bermuda, only causing light damage
 Hurricane Arlene (1967), a Category 1 hurricane in the central Atlantic Ocean which did not affect land
 Tropical Storm Arlene (1971), a tropical storm that moved parallel to the east coast of the United States without making landfall
 Tropical Storm Arlene (1981), a tropical storm that crossed Cuba and the Bahamas, with only minimal effects
 Hurricane Arlene (1987), a Category 1 hurricane that spent much of its life as a tropical storm far from land
 Tropical Storm Arlene (1993), a tropical storm that brought heavy rain to Mexico and Texas; killed 29 people
 Tropical Storm Arlene (1999), a tropical storm that drifted past the east of Bermuda
 Tropical Storm Arlene (2005), large tropical storm that made landfall in the Florida Panhandle; its remnants contributed to major flooding in upstate New York
 Tropical Storm Arlene (2011), a strong tropical storm that made landfall on Mexico, killing at least 25 people along its path
 Tropical Storm Arlene (2017), a short lived pre-season storm that meandered in the central Atlantic

References

Atlantic hurricane set index articles